The men's 800 metres event at the 1970 European Athletics Indoor Championships was held on 14 and 15 March in Vienna.

Medalists

Results

Heats
First 3 in each heat (Q) and the next 2 fastest (q) qualified for the final.

Final

References

800 metres at the European Athletics Indoor Championships
800